The MFF Digicel Cup 2012 was the 2012 edition of the MFF Cup. The winner qualified for the 2013 AFC Cup.

First round
Draw:

Results (in Burmese):

|}

Quarter-finals
Results:

|}

Semi-finals

|}

Final

References

External links
Myanmar National League
Soccer Myanmar

General Aung San Shield
Cup
Burma